The 2018 ITTF Challenge Series was the second season of the International Table Tennis Federation's secondary professional table tennis tour, a level below the ITTF World Tour.

Schedule

Below is the schedule released by the ITTF:

Winners

See also
2018 World Team Table Tennis Championships
2018 ITTF World Tour
2018 in table tennis

References

External links
International Table Tennis Federation
2018 ITTF Challenge Series

Challenge Series
ITTF Challenge Series